George, Duke of Brunswick-Lüneburg (17 February 1582, in Celle – 12 April 1641, in Hildesheim), ruled as Prince of Calenberg from 1635.

George was the sixth son of William, Duke of Brunswick-Lüneburg (1535–1592) and Dorothea of Denmark (1546–1617). His mother was daughter to King Christian III of Denmark and Dorothea of Saxe-Lauenburg. She acted as a regent during the early years of his reign, keeping power from the Councillors who had mismanaged the estates during his father's fits of insanity.

In the 1635 re-division of the territories of the House of Welf, after the death of Frederick Ulrich, Duke of Brunswick-Lüneburg, he received the Principality of Calenberg, which included the former Principality of Göttingen, since 1495, while his elder brother, Augustus the Elder, retained the Principality of Lüneburg. George was the first duke to move his residence to Hanover, where he built the Leineschloss as his residence in 1636, a palace situated by the river Leine. After his death, he was succeeded by his son, Christian Louis.

He is a character in the Eric Flint series of science fiction novels, The Ring of Fire as the Duke of Brunswick-Lüneburg, a moderate conservative member of the Crown Loyalist faction, and commander of a division in the Army of the United States of Europe.

Children
George married Anne Eleonore of Hesse-Darmstadt, daughter of Louis V, Landgrave of Hesse-Darmstadt and Magdalene of Brandenburg, in 1617. They had the following known children:
 Christian Louis, Duke of Brunswick-Lüneburg (1622–1665), Prince of Calenberg from 1641-1648, and Prince of Lüneburg from 1648-1665.
 George William, Duke of Brunswick-Lüneburg (1624–1705), Prince of Calenberg from 1648-1665, and Prince of Lüneburg from 1665-1705. He was the father of Sophia Dorothea of Celle, wife of the future King George I of Great Britain.
 John Frederick, Duke of Brunswick-Lüneburg (1625–1679), Prince of Calenberg from 1665-1679.
 Sophie Amalie of Brunswick-Lüneburg (1628–1685), who married King Frederick III of Denmark.
 Ernest Augustus, Elector of Hanover (1629–1698), Prince of Calenberg from 1679-1698, and father of King George I of Great Britain.

Ancestors

Descendants
See List of members of the House of Hanover.

External links

References

At the House of Welf site

1582 births
1641 deaths
New House of Lüneburg
Princes of Calenberg
People from Celle
Protestant monarchs
Military personnel of the Holy Roman Empire
People of the Kalmar War
Military personnel from Lower Saxony